Ryan Field may refer to:

 Baton Rouge Metropolitan Airport, also known as Ryan Field, in Baton Rouge, Louisiana, United States
 Ryan Field (airport), also known as Ryan Airfield, in Tucson, Arizona, United States
 Ryan Field (sportscaster) (born 1977), American sportscaster
 Ryan Field (stadium), football stadium at Northwestern University in Evanston, Illinois, United States